Rossborough is a surname. Notable people with the surname include:

Peter Rossborough (born 1948), English rugby union player

See also
The Rossborough Inn, a historic building in Prince George's County, Maryland, United States
Ross Borough, a former borough council in New Zealand